Denyse is a feminine given name, and may be seen as a variant of Denise. Notable people with the name include:

Denyse Alexander (born 1931), British actress
Denyse Benoit, Canadian actress, director and screenwriter
Denyse Floreano (born 1976), Venezuelan beauty pageant winner
Denyse Julien (born 1960), Canadian badminton player
Denyse Plummer, Trinidad & Tobago singer
Denyse Thomasos (1964 – 2012). Trinidadian-Canadian painter
Denyse Tontz (born 1994), American singer-songwriter, dancer and actress
Denyse Woods (born 1958), Irish writer

See also

Denise (disambiguation)
Denice (disambiguation)

Feminine given names